Charles Paul Alexander (September 25, 1889, Gloversville, New York - December 3, 1981) was an American entomologist who specialized in the craneflies, Tipulidae.

Charles Paul Alexander was the son of Emil Alexander and Jane Alexander (née Parker). Emil (the father) immigrated to the United States in 1873 and changed his surname from Schlandensky to Alexander. Charles entered Cornell University in 1909, earning a Bachelor of Science in 1913 and a Ph.D. in 1918. Between 1917 and 1919, he was entomologist at the University of Kansas, then from 1919 to 1922, at the University of Illinois.

He then became professor of entomology at Massachusetts Agricultural College at Amherst. He studied Diptera, especially in the family Tipulidae. He described over 11,000 species and genera of flies, which translates to approximately a species description a day for his entire career.

In 1920, C.P. Alexander became a Fellow of the Entomological Society of America.

Works
Partial list
A synopsis of part of the Neotropical Crane-flies of the subfamily Limnobinae
(Tipulidae) 69 p - 4 pl (1913).

Sources

Anthony Musgrave (1932). Bibliography of Australian Entomology, 1775–1930, with biographical notes on authors and collectors, Royal Zoological Society of News South Wales (Sydney): viii + 380.

External links

From the Smithsonian Institution Archives
Charles P. Alexander Papers, 1905-1979
Charles P. Alexander Papers, 1930-1977
Published works (Under List of 4733 Crane Fly Literature Citations)
Systema Dipterorum Provides complete Charles Paul Alexander Diptera Bibliography
Systema Dipterorum Provides complete list of genera and species described by Charles Paul Alexander (13,446 taxa)
NomenclatorZoologicus Full list of Alexander genera via search (363 genera)

1889 births
1981 deaths
American entomologists
Cornell University alumni
University of Kansas faculty
University of Illinois Urbana-Champaign faculty
University of Massachusetts Amherst faculty
Fellows of the Entomological Society of America
20th-century American zoologists
Presidents of the Entomological Society of America